Bull Creek is a  long 2nd order tributary to the Ararat River in Surry County, North Carolina.

Variant names
According to the Geographic Names Information System, it has also been known historically as:
Bull Run
Bull Run Creek

Course
Bull Creek rises on the Caddle Creek divide about 2 miles north of Black Water, North Carolina.  Bull Creek then flows southeast to join the Ararat River about 3 miles northeast of Pine Hill, North Carolina.

Watershed
Bull Creek drains  of area, receives about 47.8 in/year of precipitation, has a wetness index of 358.20, and is about 43% forested.

See also
List of rivers of North Carolina

References

Rivers of North Carolina
Rivers of Surry County, North Carolina